Anette Hovind Johansen (born 24 March 1980) is a Norwegian handball player. She played for Nordstrand and for the Danish club GOG Svendborg TGI.

She made her debut on the Norwegian national team in 2000, and played 99 matches and scored 231 goals for the national team between 2000 and 2008. She is European champion from 2006. She received a silver medal at the 2007 World Women's Handball Championship.

References

External links

1980 births
Living people
Norwegian female handball players
21st-century Norwegian women